Raíces were an Argentine rock band founded in 1977 by Roberto Valencia, who played keyboards and percussion. After Valencia departed to Europe , he was replaced by Andrés Calamaro. The band dissolved with the death of Beto Satragni in 2010. Valencia together with Satragni were the main composers of the band.

Discography
Raíces 30 Años, Raíces with Andrés Calamaro 2008

References

Argentine rock music groups